Mark Schwahn (born July 5, 1966) is an American former screenwriter, director, and producer. He is best known as the creator of the WB/CW teen drama series One Tree Hill. His career abruptly ended in 2018 due to widespread sexual harassment accusations by the show's female cast and crew members during its production.

Career
Schwahn has co-written Coach Carter (2005), The Perfect Score (2004), Whatever It Takes (2000) and 35 Miles from Normal (1997). In addition, he was creator of the TV series One Tree Hill, for which he also wrote and directed.

He served as producer for Whatever It Takes and One Tree Hill. He also directed 35 Miles from Normal, which he filmed in his hometown of Pontiac, Illinois.

His last major project was creating the E! scripted series The Royals.

Melrose Place spinoff
He emerged as a top candidate to write a planned  spin-off of Melrose Place shortly after the network and CBS Paramount Television announced it in late October 2008. Schwahn signed a two-year deal with CPT in early October 2008, but it had not started until June 2009. Until then, he was under a pact with Warner Bros. Television, where he ran One Tree Hill. His agreement with Warner Bros. called for him to continue as executive producer and showrunner on One Tree Hill returning for the ninth and final season in January 2012. The move to tap Schwahn to conceive a contemporary version of Melrose Place resembles The CW and CPT's decision to have Veronica Mars creator Rob Thomas pen the original script for 90210. In early 2009, it was announced Schwahn would not be working on the project.

Sexual harassment allegations
On November 12, 2017, TV writer Audrey Wauchope wrote on Twitter that she and her female writing partner were sexually harassed by Schwahn while working on One Tree Hill. Female cast members supported the allegations, and Hilarie Burton and Danneel Harris alleged that they had also been sexually harassed by Schwahn. The male stars of One Tree Hill released their own statements supporting their female co-stars and crew members. Schwahn was also accused by cast members of The Royals. Twenty-five female cast and crew members of the show released their own open letter stating that they, too, had been subjected to sexual harassment by Schwahn throughout the run of the show. In light of the allegations, Schwahn was suspended and ultimately fired from The Royals.

Filmography

Crew

Cast

References

External links

1966 births
American male screenwriters
American soap opera writers
American television directors
Place of birth missing (living people)
Television producers from Illinois
Living people
University of Maryland, College Park alumni
Showrunners
People from Pontiac, Illinois
Film directors from Illinois
American male television writers
Screenwriters from Illinois